Drest son of Uudrost or son of Uudrossig was a king of the Picts from 522 to 530.

The Pictish Chronicle king lists associate him with Drest IV. Various reigns, separately and jointly, are assigned to the two Drests, varying from one to fifteen years.

References
 Anderson, Alan Orr, Early Sources of Scottish History A.D 500–1286, volume 1. Reprinted with corrections. Paul Watkins, Stamford, 1990.

External links
Pictish Chronicle 

Pictish monarchs
6th-century Scottish monarchs